Zorilispe flavoapicalis is a species of beetle in the family Cerambycidae. It was described by Breuning in 1939. It is known from the Democratic Republic of Congo.

References

Apomecynini
Beetles described in 1939
Endemic fauna of the Democratic Republic of the Congo